The 1895 Mexico Census was the first census that took place in Mexico (excluding the 1793 Census which has been lost). It took place on October 20, 1895, and the total population was 12,700,294. The results also showed that most Mexicans were Catholic.

State rankings

Languages in Mexico
83.3% of Mexicans spoke Spanish with the remainder of the population mostly speaking indigenous languages. The most widely spoken indigenous languages were Nahuatl and Mayan. The most widely spoken European language besides Spanish was English.

Immigration

See also
Demographics of Mexico

References

Censuses in Mexico
Census
Mexico